is the administrative centre of Farsund municipality in Agder county, Norway. Frelserens Church is the main church for the town.

History
The village of Farsund grew up around a protected harbour on the Lyngdalsfjorden. It was a sheltered place for merchant ships to dock as opposed to the nearby ports at Lista or Lindesnes which were exposed to the open ocean. The merchant, Jochum Brinch Lund is often referred to as the founder of the town since he was instrumental in the village receiving ladested status in 1795, giving it special trading rights. Since then, Farsund became a very busy commercial and shipping port. 

On 1 January 1838, the town of Farsund was established as a municipality of its own (see formannskapsdistrikt law). The small town existed on its own for many years. On 1 January 1903, a small area (population: 99), just outside the town of Farsund, was transferred into the town of Farsund from the neighboring municipality of Vanse. Again, in 1948 another small area (population: 64) was transferred into the town of Farsund from the neighboring municipality of Lista.

During the 1960s, there were many major municipal mergers across Norway due to the work of the Schei Committee.  On 1 January 1965, the town of Farsund (population: 2,208) was merged with the neighboring municipalities of Spind (population: 606), Herad (population: 359), and Lista (population: 4,544), creating a new, larger municipality of Farsund.

Media gallery

See also
List of towns and cities in Norway

References

Populated places in Agder
Cities and towns in Norway
Farsund
Port cities and towns in Norway
Port cities and towns of the North Sea
1795 establishments in Norway